Roman Borvanov (born 31 March 1982) is a professional tennis player who represents Moldova. He played NCAA collegiate tennis at the University of Portland. He represented the United States until the end of 2005.

Borvanov has won nine singles and seven doubles Futures titles in his career as well as three ATP Challenger Tour doubles titles. When he achieved his career high ATP singles ranking of 200 on October, 2011 he became the first Moldovan player to ever be ranked in the top 200.

Roman was sponsored by several top tennis and sports brands, including Loriet Sports, a super-premium activewear brand, with which he reached his highest ranking.

ATP Challenger and ITF Futures finals

Singles: 15 (9–6)

Doubles: 17 (10–7)

References

External links
 
 
 
 Interview with him on itftennis.com

Living people
1982 births

Moldovan emigrants to the United States
Moldovan male tennis players
Sportspeople from Chișinău